Manđelos is a village located in the Sremska Mitrovica municipality, in the Syrmia District of Vojvodina, Serbia. The village has a Serb ethnic majority and its population numbering 1,533 people (2002 census).

Name
In Serbian, the village is known as Manđelos or Манђелос and by the Hungarians as Nagyolaszi or Nagyolasz.

Notable people
 Miroslav Bogosavac is from Manđelos

 Boško Palkovljević Pinki is from Manđelos

Historical population
1961: 1,263
1971: 1,418
1981: 1,516
1991: 1,470

See also
List of places in Serbia
List of cities, towns and villages in Vojvodina

References
Slobodan Ćurčić, Broj stanovnika Vojvodine, Novi Sad, 1996.

Sremska Mitrovica
Populated places in Syrmia